Brookfield railway station was located on the Bright line serving the town of Brookfield in Victoria. It opened in September 1888 and closed on 4 October 1954. A station sign has also been erected as part of the Murray to the Mountains Rail Trail.

References

Disused railway stations in Victoria (Australia)
Railway stations in Australia opened in 1888
Railway stations closed in 1954